Bin Bunluerit or Bin Binluerit (nickname: Top; born May 27, 1962, Sa Kaeo province (Prachinburi province at the time) is a Thai actor and director whose notable works include the Thai historical drama, Bang Rajan, Panya Raenu, a series of comedy films, and the 2004 Hollywood film, Alexander.

Educations
He graduated from Dhonburi Rajabat University and Ramkhamhaeng University.

Film careers
He entered the film industry in the 1980s, along with his twin younger brother Ekapan Bunluerit, as an actor in television dramas and movies.

Volunteer work
In addition to acting, he is well known in Thailand as a volunteer for the Ruamkatanyu Foundation for over 30 years. He left in October 2020 after management did not want him to make any political statements amidst the 2020 Thai protests; he is a supporter of the monarchy.

References

External links
 

Bin Bunluerit
Bin Bunluerit
Bin Bunluerit
Bin Bunluerit
Bin Bunluerit
Bin Bunluerit
1962 births
Living people
Bin Bunluerit